Quararibea santaritensis is a species of flowering plant in the family Malvaceae. It is found only in Panama.

References

santaritensis
Endemic flora of Panama
Critically endangered flora of North America
Taxonomy articles created by Polbot